The Best of Pink Floyd: A Foot in the Door is a greatest hits album by English rock band Pink Floyd, that was released as part of the Why Pink Floyd...? 2011–12 remastering campaign. It was later released on vinyl on 26 September 2018.

Track listing

Charts

Weekly charts

Year-end charts

Certifications

References

External links
 Why Pink Floyd...? Official Site

Albums produced by David Gilmour
Albums produced by James Guthrie (record producer)
Albums produced by Nick Mason
Albums produced by Richard Wright (musician)
Albums produced by Roger Waters
Albums with cover art by Storm Thorgerson
Pink Floyd compilation albums
2011 greatest hits albums
Capitol Records compilation albums
EMI Records compilation albums
Albums recorded at CBS 30th Street Studio
Albums recorded at Studio Miraval